China Continental Team of Gansu Bank is a Chinese UCI Continental cycling team established in 2012.

Team roster

Major wins
2020
Overall Tour of Taiyuan, Peng Xin
Stage 6, Peng Xin

References

External links

UCI Continental Teams (Asia)
Cycling teams established in 2012
Cycling teams based in China